Mistress Nell is a 1915 American silent historical adventure film starring Mary Pickford. It is yet another story about Nell Gwyn taken from a Broadway play Mistress Nell that was very successful for stage actress Henrietta Crosman from 1900 to 1902. This production was produced by Adolph Zukor's production company Famous Players Film Company and released through Paramount Pictures. The film is extant.

A surviving print is held by Museum of Modern Art.

Cast
Mary Pickford as Nell Gwyn
Owen Moore as King Charles II
Arthur Hoops as Duke of Buckingham
Ruby Hoffman as Louise, Duchess of Portsmouth
Amelia Rose as Orange Moll
Mr. Henry as Nobleman
Mr. Rouse as Nobleman
Mr. Bosch as Nobleman
Henry S. Koser as Nobleman
J. Albert Hall  
Nathaniel Sack

unbilled
Hayward Mack (unknown role)

References

External links

1915 films
American films based on plays
American silent feature films
Films directed by James Kirkwood Sr.
1910s historical adventure films
American historical adventure films
American black-and-white films
Films set in London
Films set in the 17th century
Paramount Pictures films
Nell Gwyn
Cultural depictions of Charles II of England
1910s American films
Silent historical adventure films